Falsilunatia is a genus of sea snails, marine gastropod molluscs in the subfamily Globisininae of the family Naticidae, which are known as moon snails or moon shells.

Species
Species within the genus Falsilunatia include:
 Falsilunatia ambigua (Suter) 
 Falsilunatia amphiala (R. B. Watson, 1881)
 Falsilunatia benthicola (Dell, 1990)
 Falsilunatia carcellesi (Dell, 1990)
 Falsilunatia eltanini Dell, 1990
 Falsilunatia falklandica (Preston, 1913)
 Falsilunatia fartilis (Watson, 1881)
 Falsilunatia joubini (Lamy, 1911)
 Falsilunatia nigromaculata (Lamy, 1911)
 Falsilunatia notorcadensis Dell, 1990
 Falsilunatia patagonica (Philippi, 1845)
 Falsilunatia pisum (Hedley, 1916)
 Falsilunatia pseudopsila Barnard, 1963
 Falsilunatia scotiana (Dell, 1990)
 Falsilunatia xantha  (Watson, 1881) 
Species brought into synonymy
 Falsilunatia delicatula Dell, 1990: synonym of Kerguelenatica delicatula (E. A. Smith, 1902)
 Falsilunatia powelli Dell, 1956: synonym of Falsilunatia ambigua (Suter, 1913)
 Falsilunatia soluta (Gould, 1848): synonym of Falsilunatia patagonica (Philippi, 1845)
 Falsilunatia subperforata Dell, 1956: synonym of  Amauropsis subperforata (Dell, 1956)

References 

 Powell A. W. B. (1979), New Zealand Mollusca, William Collins Publishers Ltd, Auckland, New Zealand 
 Spencer, H.; Marshall. B. (2009). All Mollusca except Opisthobranchia. In: Gordon, D. (Ed.) (2009). New Zealand Inventory of Biodiversity. Volume One: Kingdom Animalia. 584 pp
 Torigoe K. & Inaba A. (2011) Revision on the classification of Recent Naticidae. Bulletin of the Nishinomiya Shell Museum 7: 133 + 15 pp., 4 pls.

External links
 Powell A. W. B. (1951). Antarctic and Subantarctic Mollusca: Pelecypoda and Gastropoda. Discovery Reports, 26: 47-196, pl. 5-10

Naticidae